The Jeep Compass is a compact crossover SUV introduced for the 2007 model year, and is currently in its second generation. The first generation Compass and Patriot, its rebadged variant, were among Jeep's first crossover SUVs. The second-generation Compass debuted in September 2016 in Brazil and at the Los Angeles International Auto Show in November 2016, sharing a modified platform with the Renegade. It is positioned between the smaller Renegade and the larger Cherokee globally or the Commander in South America.

Concept
Four years prior to the introduction of the production Jeep Compass, a concept vehicle with the same name had its world premiere in Detroit at the 2002 North American International Auto Show. It featured a two-door body, all-wheel drive and a 3.7-liter V6 engine.

The 3.7 L Power-Tech V6 engine from the Jeep Liberty was not available in the new Compass for 2007, though the production model Compass kept the concept car's styling cues and some of its features. The production model Compass also had four doors instead of the two doors on the concept car.

First generation (MK49; 2007)
Jeep debuted the production version of the Compass at the 2006 North American International Auto Show in January. The first Compass was assembled on 30 May 2006, in Belvidere, Illinois, where the Dodge Neon was produced.

The Compass did not carry the "Trail Rated" badge found on other SUVs in the Jeep family for the 2007-2010 model years, but received the "Trail Rated" badge for the 2011 model year. The Compass targets first-time Jeep buyers and those who drive primarily on paved roads.

The Compass and Patriot are both based on the DaimlerChrysler/Mitsubishi GS platform. These vehicles are differentiated by their styling and marketing: The Patriot is a traditionally styled 4-door Jeep wagon, while the Compass has a softer hatchback look, similar to the Dodge Caliber.

2011 facelift

For 2011, Jeep redesigned the Compass to more closely resemble the Grand Cherokee, while keeping its own identity. The 2011 Jeep Compass also receives a revised suspension for better handling, a revised interior with more standard equipment, and more option packages including a Freedom Drive II Off-Road Package which includes a continuously variable transmission fitted with a low-range setting, all-terrain tires inside 17-inch aluminum wheels, skid plates, a four-wheel-drive system, and an increase ground clearance of a full inch.

A special edition Compass model commemorated Jeep's 70th anniversary in 2011, and included various upgrades, special interiors, badges, wheels, and was available in only three exterior colors: Bronze Star, Bright Silver, and Black.

Powertrain
The Compass uses a  2.4 L World I4 gasoline engine. A 2.0 L l-R4 TDi  Volkswagen-designed diesel engine was available for the European and Australian markets, replaced in 2011 by the 2.2 L Mercedes-Benz OM651.

The Compass also features two electronically controlled four-wheel drive systems. Freedom Drive I and Freedom Drive II, Freedom Drive I is a full-time four-wheel drive system with locking capabilities; Freedom Drive II is based on Freedom Drive I but by using the vehicle's CVT transmission it is capable of a 19:1 gear reduction simulating a low-range usually found in vehicles with dedicated transfer cases.

The base model version has front wheel drive (FWD). The Trail Rated version of the Compass has passed the same testing of off-road ability as other Jeep vehicles in terms of traction, ground clearance, maneuverability, articulation, and water fording.

Models
The three basic models of Compass in the U.S. are Sport, Latitude, and Limited.

The Sport serves as the base model. It includes features such as seventeen-inch alloy wheels, an AM/FM stereo with single-disc CD player and four speakers, a heater, cloth seating surfaces, and manual, roll-up windows and manual door locks. Features such as power windows and door locks, a seven-speaker Boston Acoustics premium sound system with a 368-watt external amplifier, and air conditioning are options. The 2014-2016 Jeep Compass Sport and Sport SE, The Electronic Vehicle Information Center (EVIC) does not come as standard equipment. An EVIC gives the user information such as gas mileage, number of miles to empty, service intervals, tire pressure, etc.

The Latitude is the midrange model. It added features onto the Sport, such as air conditioning, keyless entry, a security system, and power windows and door locks. The EVIC comes as an optional component with the security and cargo convenience package. This option comes with an alarm, tonneau cover, tire pressure monitoring display, garage door opener, and an electronic vehicle information center. The model became available in 2011.

The Limited is the top-of-the-line model. It added features such as leather-trimmed seats, had an available sunroof, and remote starter.

A 70th Anniversary Edition was based on the Sport model. It added air conditioning, unique leather-trimmed seats, unique alloy wheels, a sunroof, side-impact airbags, a seven-speaker Boston Acoustics premium sound system with a 368-watt external amplifier, power windows and door locks, keyless entry, and a security alarm. This special edition model was only offered in 2011 to celebrate Jeep's 70th anniversary. All Jeep models for 2011 only offered a 70th Anniversary Edition model (Compass, Patriot, Wrangler, Wrangler Unlimited, Liberty, and the Grand Cherokee).

An Altitude Edition model was made available in 2012. It was based upon the Latitude model and added black-painted alloy wheels, leather-trimmed seats, a sunroof, and a Boston Acoustics premium sound system with a 368-watt external amplifier. The Altitude package was available on the Jeep Grand Cherokee only at first, but then was available on the Compass, Patriot, Wrangler, and Wrangler Unlimited as well. All models except the Jeep Grand Cherokee dropped this model (the Grand Cherokee model continued to offer this model for the 2013 model year). The Altitude name was chosen in a contest to name a Grand Cherokee concept car. Because of the Altitude's popularity, Jeep decided to offer it on all models except for the Jeep Liberty, which had been discontinued.

The Jeep Patriot and first generation Jeep Compass were phased out during the 2016 model year, replaced by a single redesigned Compass SUV that FCA debuted in late 2016.

Safety
The Compass was safety tested by Euro NCAP in 2012 and earned a two-star rating.

Second generation (MP/552; 2016)

The second-generation of Jeep Compass debuted on 27 September 2016 in Brazil and at the Los Angeles International Auto Show in November 2016, replacing the Jeep Patriot and first generation Compass. Production for North American-market Compass models was moved to Toluca, Mexico, while Jeep Cherokee (KL) production will move from Toledo, Ohio to Belvidere, Illinois, where the first-generation Compass and Jeep Patriot were both assembled. 

Using a stretched version of the same platform as the Renegade, the Compass is available in four distinct trim levels: the base Sport, the mid-level Latitude, the higher-end Limited, and the off-road-focused Trailhawk. All trim levels are available with either front-wheel drive or four-wheel drive, with the exception of the Trailhawk, which is only available in a 4WD configuration.

In the United States, the Compass comes equipped with a 2.4 L Tigershark four-cylinder engine. More than 65 percent of the upper body structure and the frame is made of high-strength steel. Styling of the second-generation Compass is inspired by two of its larger siblings, the Jeep Cherokee (KL) and Jeep Grand Cherokee (WK2). Styling elements taken from the Grand Cherokee include headlamps integrated into the front grille and a narrow front grille with a black finish, while the Cherokee lends some of its rear end styling elements, basic interior design, and 2.4 L Tigershark inline four-cylinder (I4) gasoline engine and ZF-sourced nine-speed 948TE automatic transmission to the overall design of the Compass.

Available features include FCA's UConnect 4C 8.4 and 8.4N touch-screen infotainment systems, a Beats Premium Audio System with a 506-watt digital amplifier, eighteen-inch aluminum alloy wheels, Jeep's Command-View panoramic sunroof, LED front headlamps, Forward Collision Warning, a ParkView rear-view backup camera system, front and rear parking sensors, Blind Spot Information System (BLIS), and Jeep's Selec-Terrain full-time four-wheel-drive system (standard on the Trailhawk model).

Production 
The Compass is assembled at plants in Italy, Mexico, Brazil, China, and India. North American and European models are manufactured in Melfi, Italy (designation: BU/520) and Toluca, Mexico (designation: MP/522); moved from Belvidere, Illinois. In Brazil, the second-generation Jeep Compass start production the 26 September 2016 at FCA new Goiana, Pernambuco Assembly Plant (designation: M1/551). Chinese models were produced by the GAC Fiat Chrysler joint venture (designation: M4/553) Production of the first-generation Compass and Patriot ended early 2017, with production of the second generation Compass beginning in spring of 2017 for North American models. Assembled at Fiat's facility in Ranjangaon, Maharashtra, it is Jeep's first model assembled in India (designation: M6/566). The right-hand drive version is solely produced at the Indian plant.

India 
The Compass was unveiled in India on 12 April 2017 and assembled in the FCA India Pune plant since 1 July 2017. In addition to manufacturing for the Indian market, Jeep also exports the Indian-made Compass to many right-hand drive markets such as the United Kingdom, Australia, New Zealand, Brunei, Japan, Indonesia, Nepal, and Thailand. The India-spec model is available with two engine options - a 1.4-liter I4, turbocharged MultiAir petrol, and a 2.0-liter I4, turbocharged Multijet II diesel engine. In 2017 Jeep sold about 10,000 Compasses in India from the day of release until the middle of December.

In 2017, the vehicle contains over 65% Indian parts.

Facelift 
In 2020, a facelift for the model was first launched in China, with slight visual changes to the exterior of the vehicle, and a completely redesigned interior. In January 2021, the Compass facelift was released in India. It gets a revised front profile, a larger grille, a new front bumper with a larger air dam, slimmer headlights with Integrated LED DRLs, LED fog lights, and new alloy wheels.

The 2022 US model includes over-the-air updates and includes collision warning with automatic braking, lane-keep assist, pedestrian/cycle detection, active lane management, blind-spot monitor, and rear cross-traffic alert. It also includes a semi-autonomous assist system called Highway Assist that allows for hand-on-wheel and eyes-on-road automated driving.

The 2022 Compass lineup consists of existing Sport, Latitude, Trailhawk, Limited, and High Altitude models, although a new Latitude Lux model, slotting between the mid-range Latitude and luxury-oriented Limited trims, becomes available. A limited-edition (RED) Edition model is also available, based on the Limited trim. The sole engine remains the naturally-aspirated 2.4-liter Tigershark four-cylinder gasoline engine producing 177 horsepower and 172 lb. ft. of torque (down 3 horsepower and 3 lb. ft. of torque, from 180 and 175, respectively). All four-wheel drive models receive the nine-speed 948TE automatic ZF 9HP transmission as standard equipment, while front wheel drive models receive the six-speed Aisin automatic transmission as standard. Sport and Latitude models are available with front-wheel-drive with optional all-wheel-drive, while all other models now include standard all-wheel-drive.

Special editions 
In addition to the standard trim levels, Altitude and High Altitude Special Editions are available for the Latitude and Limited trim levels respectively and added "blacked-out" exterior accents, black alloy wheels, as well as other features to their respective trim levels. 

The Upland Special Edition model is also available for the base Sport trim level and adds black alloy wheels, blue accent trim for the exterior badging, Trailhawk-inspired exterior styling elements, and blue stitching on the interior. It is only available with four-wheel-drive (4WD), the 2.4 L I4 engine, and an automatic transmission.

An 80th Anniversary Edition version of the Latitude trim level, that adds unique exterior accents and a few extra features, is available for the 2021 model year.

For 2022, Jeep unveiled a line of vehicles in partnership with Product Red, with each brand releasing a special-edition vehicle with (RED) branding. The Product Red Jeep Compass is based on the Limited trim level, and is available exclusively in Redline 3-Coat Pearl Metallic paired with a Black perforated leather-trimmed interior with red interior stitching. In addition, the Compass (RED) Edition includes special exterior badging, and wheels from the Limited-based High Altitude Edition. In addition to a special-edition vehicle, Jeep will also release branded (RED) merchandise that will be available for purchase. Proceeds from each sale of a (RED)-branded vehicle will be donated to the Product Red Foundation.

Safety

Euro NCAP

IIHS

2017

2022
The 2022 Compass was tested by the IIHS and its top trim earned a Top Safety Pick award:

Sales

Notes

References

External links

Official website
 

Compass
Cars introduced in 2006
2010s cars
2020s cars
Compact sport utility vehicles
Crossover sport utility vehicles
All-wheel-drive vehicles
Front-wheel-drive vehicles
Euro NCAP small off-road
Vehicles with CVT transmission
Cars of Brazil
Latin NCAP small off-road